Mossend Swifts were a Scottish senior football club from the shale mining village of Mossend, just to the north of the town of West Calder, West Lothian. There is now little left of this village (not to be confused with Mossend in North Lanarkshire – contiguous with Bellshill – which also had teams operating in the same era).

History

A renowned cup team, they once defeated Hibernian in the Scottish Cup 2–1 in season 1888-89 at Mossend Park in front of a crowd of 2,000.

Already by 1891 there was talk of a possible merger with West Calder F.C. on the basis that West Calder could not support two football clubs.  The merger with finally took place in May 1903, the merger creating a new club, West Calder Swifts F.C.; although the name was a merger of the two teams' names, the combined club played at West Calder's ground, wearing West Calder's kit.  The club's trainer however was the Mossend Swifts trainer David Bowman, who finished with 23 years' service at both sides.

Colours

The club originally gave its colours as red and white, and by 1889 was wearing blue and white stripes.  From 1900 to the club's end it wore maroon shirts.

Honours
East of Scotland Shield
 Winner: 1887–88, 1895–96

King Cup
 Winner 1887–88, 1888–89, 1896–97

East of Scotland Qualifying Cup
 Runner-up 1897–98

Linlithgowshire Cup
 Winner 1884–85

Rosebery Charity Cup
 Winner 1888–89
 Runner-up 1887–88

Notable former players

Two players were capped for Scotland whilst with Mossend Swifts. Robert (Bob) Boyd won two caps against Ireland in 1889 and Wales in 1891. Dave Ellis was one of five brothers who played for Swifts and earned his solitary cap against Ireland in 1892.

  Bob Boyd
  Dave Ellis
  James Ellis
  George Hogg
  Tom Nicol

External links
 Mossend, Museum of Shale Oil Industry in Scotland
 Mossend, Vision of Britain

References

Association football clubs established in 1879
Association football clubs disestablished in 1903
Football clubs in Scotland
Football in West Lothian
1879 establishments in Scotland
1903 disestablishments in Scotland